Jorge Majfud (born September 10, 1969) is a Uruguayan American writer.

Life
He was born in Tacuarembó, Uruguay. He received a professional degree in Architecture in 1996 from the University of the Republic in Montevideo and studied at Escuela Nacional de Bellas Artes. He traveled extensively to gather material that would later become part of his novels and essays and was a professor at the Universidad Hispanoamericana of Costa Rica and at Escuela Técnica del Uruguay, where he taught art and mathematics.

In 2003 he entered the University of Georgia, where he obtained a Masters and a Ph.D. in the Department of Romance Languages. He is a member of the scientific committee of the Araucaria review of Spain, The Honor Society of Phi Kappa Phi, and a Professional Member of PEN American Center. He taught at the University of Georgia and was a professor at Lincoln University in Pennsylvania. Currently, he is a professor at Jacksonville University. 
Majfud has won many the Excellence in Research Award in Humanities and Letters 2006, Casa de las Américas prize 2001, Juan Rulfo Award finalist 2011, Faculty Award for Excellence in Scholarship and Professional Activities, Jacksonville University, 2013, and winner Premio Letterario Internazionale Indipendente Settima edizione Award (The Independent International Literary Award 2019, Italy).

His novels and essays are under study in different universities in Europe, the U.S., and Latin America. "He is one of the most important writers of a new generation of Latino intellectuals". In 2012, readers of the American magazine Foreign Policy (now EsGlobal in Spanish) recognized him as "The Most Influential Latin American Intellectual" 
He delivered public lectures at many universities and events around the world

Works
His publications include:
Hacia qué patrias del silencio / memorias de un desaparecido (novel, 1996)
Crítica de la pasión pura (essays, 1998)
La reina de América (novel, 2001)
El tiempo que me tocó vivir (essays, 2004)
La narración de lo invisible / Significados ideológicos de América Latina (essays, 2006)
Perdona nuestros pecados (short stories, 2007)
La ciudad de la Luna (novel, 2009) 
Crisis (novel, 2012)
Cyborgs (essays, 2012)
 El eterno retorno de Quetzalcoátl, 2012. 
 Cuentos, audiobook, 2014
 Cine político latinoamericano, essays, 2014
 Herrmenéutica, essays, 2014
 El pasado siempre vuelve, short stories, 2014
 Algo salió mal, short stories, 2015
 El mar estaba sereno, novel, 2017
 USA. ¿Confía Dios en nosotros?, essays, 2017 
 Neomedievalism. Reflections on the Post-Enlightenment Era, essays, 2018 
 Tequila, novel, 2018
 El mismo fuego, novel, 2019  
 Perros sí, negros no, essays, 2020 
 Silicona 5.0, novel, 2020 
 La frontera salvaje: 200 años de fanatismo anglosajón en América latina, history essay, 2021 
 La privatización de la verdad. La continuidad de la ideología esclavista en Estados Unidos, essay, 2021 
 El otoño de la plutocracia estadounidense, essays, 2023

As contributor or editor

 2020, Crónicas del coronavirus (Editorial Irreverentes) 
 2020, Diccionario de autobiografías intelectuales (Universidad Nacional de Lanus) 
 2019, Unwanted People (University of Valencia Press, PUV) by Aviva Chomsky.  
 2018, Cinco entrevistas a Noam Chomsky (Le Monde Diplomatique / Editorial Aun Creemos en los Sueños) by Michel Foucault, Ignacio Ramonet, Daniel Mermet, Jorge Majfud y Federico Kukso. 
 2018, "Vsa teža zakona" (Zgodbe iz Urugvaja. Antologija sodobne urugvajske kratke proze/Anthology of contemporary Uruguayan short prose). Translated by Yuri Kunaver.  
 2017, The Routledge History of Latin American Culture (Edited by Carlos Manuel Salomon)  Routledge Histories.
 2017, Pertenencia. Narradores sudamericanos en Estados Unidos. Antología. (Melanie Márquez Adams, Hemil García Linares, editores). Ars Communis Editorial, Publisher. .
 2016, Ruido Blanco. Antología de cuentos de ciencia ficción uruguaya. (Mónica Marchesky, coordinador)  M Ed.
 2013, De la indignación a la rebeldía (con Eduardo Galeano, Carlos Taibo y Slavoj Zizek). . Ediciones Irreverentes.
 2012. Ilusionistas. , by Noam Chomsky. Edition, translation, and introduction. .  Ediciones Irreverentes.
 2012, Antología de Nueva York. . Ediciones Irreverentes.
 2012, Antología de ciencia ficción, 2099. . Ediciones Irreverentes. 
 2011, Microantología del Microrrelato III. .
 2011, Truman, Hiroshima.  (con Eduardo Galeano) Ediciones Irreverentes.
 2010, El libro del voyeur. . Ediciones del viento.
 2010, Microantología del Microrrelato II. .
 2010, Entre Orientales y Atlantes. Antología de relatos uruguayo-canaria. . Editorial Baile del Sol.
 2007, Las palabras pueden. . (con Ernesto Sábato, Mario Vargas Llosa, José Saramago y otros ) United Nations Children's Fund (New York: UNICEF-UN).
 2008, Los testimonios, de Roque Dalton. . Baile del Sol.
 2008, Diccionario alternativo. . (con Hugo Biagini y Arturo Andrés Roig). Aguilar/Alfaguara.
 2007, América Latina hacia su segunda independencia.  (con Hugo Biagini y Arturo Andrés Roig. Aguilar / Alfaguara.
 1999, Entre siglos/Entre séculos. .

His stories and articles have been published in daily newspapers, magazines, and readers, such as El País of Madrid, El País and La República  of Montevideo, Courrier International of Paris , Rebellion, Hispanic Culture Review of George Mason University, Revista de Crítica Literaria Latinoamericana of Dartmouth College, Pegaso of the University of Oklahoma, Texas State University, Washington University Political Review, Chasqui of Arizona State University, Hispamerica of University of Maryland, United Nations Chronicle, UNICEF, Araucaria of Spain, etc. He has been the founder and editor of the magazine SigloXXI – reflexiones sobre nuestro tiempo. He is a contributor to El Pais, La República of Montevideo, La Vanguardia of Barcelona, Tiempos del Mundo of Washington, Monthly Review of New York, The Huffington Post, Milenio of Mexico, Jornada of La Paz, Panama America, El Nuevo Herald of Miami, Página/12 of Buenos Aires, Cambio16 of Spain, Centro Cervantes of Madrid, The Humanist of the American Humanist Association, Radio Uruguay, Radio Nacional de Argentina , Radio Exterior de España], Radio Popolare Roma, NTN 24 TV , Russia TV (RT), and many other daily and weekly newspapers. He is a member of the International Scientific Committee of the magazine Araucaria  in Spain.

His essays and articles have been translated into Portuguese, French, English, German, Italian, Basque, Greek, and many others. He is also the editor and translator of Ilusionistas, the latest book of Noam Chomsky in Spanish (Madrid, 2012).

He has published many books with authors like Slavoj Zizek, Eduardo Galeano, Ray Bradbury, José Saramago, Mario Vargas Llosa, Carlos Fuentes, and Ernesto Sábato.

In November 2019, after the coup d'état in Bolivia, Jorge Majfud called on OAS Secretary General Luis Almagro to resign from his post. The letter went viral and was supported by millions of Latin Americans.

Awards
He has distinguished himself in different international contests, for example:
Mention at Premio Casa de las Américas, in Habana, Cuba in 2001, for the novel La Reina de América, "because it stands out as an intense writing regarding the established powers by the use of parody and irony," according to the panel of judges composed of Belén Gopegui (Spain), Andrés Rivera (Argentina), Mayra Santos Febres (Puerto Rico) and others
Excellence in Research Award, University of Georgia, 2006
Faculty Award for Excellence in Scholarship and Professional Activities, Jacksonville University, 2013.
2014 International Latino Book Awards Finalist
2019 Premio Letterario Internazionale Indipendente Award

Further reading
 Ferrer Herrero, Raúl. El otro en Jorge Majfud. Madrid: Ediciones Irreverentes, 2017 
 Taiano, Leonor. De un infierno a otro: El migrante latino en Crisis de Jorge Majfud Rio: Universidade do Estado do Rio de Janeiro Press, 2018 
 Taiano, Leonor. Finisterre: en el últimolugar del mundo. "Huyendo hacia la paradoja del tío Sam: Consideraciones sobre Crisis de Jorge Majfud" (123-148) 
 Gianni, Silvia M. "Identidad de la ausencia", University of Milan.(117-122) 
 Pluta, Nina. "Migrancias y la dimensión transnacional de la crítica en la narrativa de Jorge Majfud" Arizona State University and Uniwersytet Pedagogiczny, Kraków (Poland)

References

External links

 "Los 10 autores hispanos del momento", Impacto Latin News, New York, 2013.
 Twitter
 "La escritura sin anestesias de un uruguayo universal: Entrevista a Jorge Majfud" Revista Mito, by Leonor Taiano. June 8, 2016.
 Books in WorldCat
 Editorial Baile del Sol
 Ediciones Irreverentes
 The Age of Barbaria
 "Crossing borders and more: A professor profile on Dr. Jorge Majfud"
 Introducción a la literatura
 Tendencias 
 La Republica's Critique and Book Review
 La ciudad de la Luna, a Spanish National Radio Interview
 An Interview
 La ciudad de la Luna
 Narrativa uruguaya de principios de siglo.
 Amazon.com
 Radio Exterior de España
 Línea Abierta. Texas-California edition. Entrevista de Samuel Schmidt (Audio)
 Nuevos escritores uruguayos: Centro Virtual Cervantes
 Pensamiento Latinoamericano
 Books at Biblioteca Miguel de Cervantes
 Cambio16
 Interview of María Luisa Pedrós

1969 births
Living people
People from Tacuarembó
Psychological fiction writers
Uruguayan people of Lebanese descent
Uruguayan male writers
Hispanic and Latino American writers
Hispanic and Latino American novelists
American Spanish-language writers
Latin Americanists
Uruguayan architects
University of the Republic (Uruguay) alumni
University of Georgia alumni
Jacksonville University faculty
Uruguayan emigrants to the United States
21st-century American novelists
American male novelists
21st-century American male writers
Novelists from Florida